The Avro 508 was a prototype British reconnaissance aircraft of the 1910s.

Development

The Avro 508 was built at Avro's Manchester works in December 1913 and assembled at Brooklands in January 1914. First exhibited in Manchester in January 1914, the 508 was a wooden fabric-covered pusher biplane of unusual shape, resembling a back-to-front Avro 504. Its top and bottom three-bay wings were equal in length, made of fabric-covered wood.

Operational history
It was completed by March 1914, and shown at the Olympia Aero Show in London, however its first flight was at the start of official testing in April 1915 at Brooklands. The Royal Flying Corps showed no interest in the sole prototype and therefore the aircraft remained a training aircraft and engine tester at Hendon Aerodrome until it was dismantled in April 1916.

Specifications

References

 "The Olympia Exhibition: The Exhibits: Avro (A.V. Roe & Co.)". Flight, 21 March 1914. pp. 295–297.
Jackson, A.J. Avro Aircraft since 1908. London:Putnam, 1990. .

1910s British fighter aircraft
508
Single-engined pusher aircraft
Aircraft first flown in 1915
1910s British military reconnaissance aircraft
Rotary-engined aircraft